"Paid in Full" is a single by the Finnish power metal band Sonata Arctica. It was released on 27 April 2007. The single is from the album Unia and features a cover of Gary Moore's "Out in the Fields". The album art also includes Sonata Arctica's new logo design. 

The song debuted at number 1 on the Finnish national music charts.

Track listing
 "Paid in Full" (Radio Edit) − 3:50
 "Out in the Fields" (Gary Moore cover) − 4:06
 "Paid in Full" (Album Version) − 4:24

Personnel
Tony Kakko - Vocals
Jani Liimatainen - Guitar
Marko Paasikoski - Bass
Henrik Klingenberg - Keyboards, Piano
Tommy Portimo - Drums

Info
Mixed at Finnvox Studios by Mikko Karmila.
Mastered at Cutting Room by Björn Egelmann.

References

2007 songs
Number-one singles in Finland
Sonata Arctica songs
Nuclear Blast Records singles